Cathal Coughlan (16 December 1960 – 18 May 2022) was an Irish singer and songwriter from Cork, best known as the frontman of the band Microdisney, formed with Sean O'Hagan in 1980. Their second album The Clock Comes Down the Stairs reached number one in the UK Indie Chart. They developed cult followings in the Irish and UK indie music scenes before breaking up in 1988.

Coughlan went on to lead the harder-edged The Fatima Mansions, who found critical success with their aggressive live shows and five consistent albums, but broke up in 1995.

In the following years Coughlan released intermittent solo material with musicians such as O’Hagan, Jonathan Fell and Nick Allum. His solo career and reputation peaked in 2021 with the well received album Song of Co-Aklan (composed from the point of view of his alter ego "Co Aklan") which was released to critical acclaim fifteen years after his previous solo album Foburg (2006).

Career

Microdisney 

Born in the village of Glounthaune, just outside of Cork city, Coughlan was active on the local Cork scene in the late 1970s, and after meeting Sean O'Hagan formed Microdisney as a duo in 1980. Following early local success, they moved to London, and recorded for the independent record label Rough Trade and, later and unsuccessfully, for the major label Virgin Records.

His lyrics with Microdisney focus on politics, relationships and the interplay between the two, and incorporate surreal imagery and literary and historical references. His voice on these records has been compared to Scott Walker, whom Coughlan considered a major influence. They broke up in 1988, after which O'Hagan and Coughlan formed separate bands, the High Llamas and the Fatima Mansions.

Microdisney reunited after three decades and performed together in London, Dublin and Cork in 2018 and 2019. In 2018, Coughlan and his bandmates received the IMRO/NCH Trailblazer Award, given to "culturally important" Irish albums (in this instance, for the 1985 album The Clock Comes Down The Stairs).

The Fatima Mansions

Coughlan formed the Fatima Mansions in 1988, naming the band after the large public housing complex in the working class area of Rialto in Dublin's inner city. They became known for their aggressive music and song titles, including the early tracks "Blues for Ceausescu" and "Bugs Fucking Bunny". Their 1989 debut album was Against Nature followed by Viva Dead Ponies in 1990 and the 1991 EP Bertie's Brochures and the acclaimed albums Valhalla Avenue (1992) and Lost in the Former West (1994). Due to intra-band tension and contractual difficulties with Virgin Records, Fatima Mansions broke up in 1995.

Solo work and collaborations
Contractual issues prevented Coughlan from performing in the aftermath of break up of the Fatima Mansions. His following album was released in August 2010 with the single Rancho Tetrahedron, credited to "Cathal Coughlan and the Grand Necropolitan Quartet". He later admitted that the supporting live performances were aggressive "because there was just all this business nonsense going on and I wasn’t able to perform new stuff in public at all because I was in certain contractual difficulties". Reviewing the album, The Irish Times wrote that "Coughlan's mixture of acerbity and dark lyricism is sustained on his fifth solo album, that there is a subtle Latin influence on the music, and Coughlan's Scott Walker inflected voice has never sounded better."

He recorded with comedian Sean Hughes, High Llamas drummer Rob Allum (under the name of his alter-ego "Cod"), and Paul Jarvis of SLAB! as "Bubonique", releasing a number of CDs parodying current musical trends, including the albums 20 Golden Showers and Trance Arse Volume 3. He collaborated in 2011 with the British The Auteurs and Black Box Recorder vocalist Luke Haines on the song/speech show The North Sea Scrolls which premiering at the Edinburgh Fringe Festival in 2011. The studio recording of The North Sea Scrolls was released on 19 November 2012.

Coughlan's last album Song of Co-Aklan was completed at the end of 2019 in collaboration with Nick Allum, Aindrias O'Gruama, Jon Fell, Luke Haines, Audrey Riley, James Woodrow and Rhodri Marsden. It was preceded by the single "Song of Co-Aklan" and released in March 2021 on Dimple Discs. He formed the duo Telefís with US-based Irish producer and musician Jacknife Lee with whom he released the album A hAon in 2022. and a further release A Dó  in October 2022.

Personal life
Coughlan, survived by his wife, Julie, died aged 61 in hospital on 18 May 2022 after a long illness.

Discography

Microdisney
 Kaught at the Kampus (compilation EP) – 1980
 We Hate You South African Bastards! – 1984
 Everybody Is Fantastic (1984)
 The Clock Comes Down the Stairs – 1985, re-issued in 2013
 Crooked Mile – 1986
 39 Minutes – 1988

Fatima Mansions
 Against Nature – 1989
 Viva Dead Ponies – 1990
 Bertie's Brochures – (mini-album) 1991
 Valhalla Avenue – 1992
 Lost in the Former West – 1994

Solo
 Grand Necropolitan – 1996
 Black River Falls – 2000
 The Sky's Awful Blue – 2002
 Foburg – 2006
 Rancho Tetrahedron– 2010
 Song of Co-Aklan - 2021

Telefís 
 a hAon – 2022
 a Dó - 2022

Citations

General sources 
 McDermott, Paul. "Get That Monster Off the Stage". Audio documentary, Raidió Teilifís Éireann, 2001
 McDermott, Paul. "Iron Fist in Velvet Glove — the story of Microdisney". Audio documentary, Newstalk/University College Cork, 2018

External links
 Official site
 Documentary – The Adventures of Flannery
 Micro-Disney at irishrock.org

1960 births
2022 deaths
Cathal Coughlan
Irish male singer-songwriters
Microdisney members
Musicians from Cork (city)
People educated at Presentation Brothers College, Cork
Post-punk musicians
Year of birth uncertain